Sergio Fajardo Valderrama (born 19 June 1956) is a Colombian politician and mathematician. Fajardo served as the Governor of Antioquia from 2012 to 2016.  He first entered politics in 2003 when he was elected Mayor of Medellin, the second-largest city in Colombia and the capital of Antioquia.  Fajardo was the vice presidential nominee of Antanas Mockus in 2010, finishing in second place after losing the runoff against Juan Manuel Santos and Angelino Garzon. Fajardo brands himself as a pragmatic politician with no particular ideology, with political analysts and media outlets in Colombia labelling him as a centrist politician not tied to the traditional parties in Colombia.

In July 2017, Fajardo announced his campaign to run for president in the upcoming elections in 2018. During the 2018 Colombian presidential election, Fajardo finished third in the first round. In March 2022, Fajardo announced that he would begin his presidential campaign for the upcoming 2022 Colombian presidential election. He finished fourth in the first round.

Early life and education
Fajardo was born and raised in Medellín, Colombia. There he graduated (high school) from the Colegio Benedictino and then moved to Bogotá to receive an undergraduate and a graduate degree (M.Sc.) in mathematics from the Universidad de los Andes in Bogotá. Fajardo later went to the United States for his doctorate degree, and earned a PhD in mathematics with a minor in economics from the University of Wisconsin-Madison.

Career
Before entering politics at age 40, Fajardo taught mathematical logic at the Universidad de los Andes and the Universidad Nacional of Colombia, while also taking part of organizations such as the National Council for Sciences and the Peace Commission in Antioquia.
 
In 2003, Fajardo was elected as the first independent mayor of Medellín. During his four-year administration, he led a significant transformation of the city, for which he was named best mayor of Colombia  in 2007 and has also received other national and international awards.

In 2010, Fajardo was vice presidential candidate with the also independent politician and mathematician Antanas Mockus. From 2012 to 2015, he was elected governor of the state of Antioquia. During his administration, Antioquia experienced the best national performance in open government, transparency, and investment of oil royalties according to the National Planning Department and the Anti corruption Office of Colombia. He was named the best governor of the country in 2015 by the organization Colombia Líder.

Fajardo launched his independent presidential candidacy in 2018, which was supported by the Coalición Colombia, made up of the Green Party, the Polo Democrático and his movement, Compromiso Ciudadano. In the first round of elections, Fajardo obtained more than 4.6 million votes, only 1.5% away from passing to the second round.

Currently, Fajardo is professor at the School of Government and Public Transformation of the Instituto Tecnológico of Monterrey in Mexico and of the School of Political Formation of Compromiso Ciudadano in Colombia. A member of the Inter-American Dialogue, Fajardo intends to represent a Third Way inspired by former British Prime Minister Tony Blair to overcome the traditional divide on the left–right political spectrum. The Colombian Communist Party accused Fajardo of trying to perpetuate the Colombian neoliberal system under the guise of moderation and pragmatism.

Personal life 
Fajardo is father to Mariana and Alejandro Fajardo Arboleda.

Publications 
 Fajardo, S., Keisler, H.J. (2002), Model Theory of Stochastic Processes. Lecture Notes in Logic.  Association for Symbolic Logic. A.K.Peters, Natick, MA. .
 Fajardo, S. (2007), Medellín del miedo a la esperanza. Alcaldía de Medellín.
 Fajardo, S. (2017), El poder de la decencia. Editorial Planeta.

References

External links 

A conversation with Sergio Fajardo, former mayor of Medellín
Sergio Fajardo Profile at Mathematics Genealogy Project

1956 births
Living people
Colombian journalists
20th-century Colombian mathematicians
Indigenous Social Alliance Movement politicians
Male journalists
Mayors of Medellín
Members of the Inter-American Dialogue
University of Wisconsin–Madison College of Letters and Science alumni